Bharoli Junction (station code: BHRL) is located in Pathankot district in the Indian state of Punjab and serves Bharoli Kalan village. Bharoli station falls under Firozpur railway division of Northern Railway zone of Indian Railways.

Overview 
This station is located on the single track,  broad gauge, Amritsar–Pathankot line which was established in 1884. Bharoli station also lies on double track Jalandhar–Jammu line creating a junction between two routes.

Electrification 
Bharoli railway station is situated on single track DMU Amritsar–Pathankot line and double track electrified Jalandhar–Jammu line. It was reported in April 2019 that the electrification of the single track BG Amritsar–Pathankot line had commenced.

Amenities 
Bharoli railway station has 2 booking windows, no enquiry office and just very basic amenities like drinking water, public toilets, sheltered area with adequate seating. The station had small footfall of 253 persons per day in 2018. Wheelchair availability is not there for disabled persons. There are two platforms at the station but no foot over bridge(FOB).

References

External links 

 Pictures of Bharoli Junction railway station

Railway stations in Pathankot district
Firozpur railway division